Palmadusta humphreyii, common name : Humphrey's cowrie, is a species of sea snail, a cowry, a marine gastropod mollusk in the family Cypraeidae, the cowries.

Spelling
The epithet humphreysii is an incorrect original spelling that was corrected by Gray himself in the errata page of the same volume of the Journal. See Petit (2012: 91):

"11. The species name humphreyii was on page 489, in error, as humphreysii. This was corrected by Gray on the Errata page [603] of the same volume of the Journal. This is a correct and valid emendation under I.C.Z.N. Article 32.5.1.1. The name with its original incorrect spelling is in current usage, the errata sheet evidently having been overlooked by Cypraea specialists. Iredale & McMichael (1962: 61) list “humphreyii (humphreysii errore)” but do not mention the errata page. Schilder & Schilder (1971: 122) attributed that usage to Iredale & McMichael and listed it as “published in a not valid way” in the synonymy of Palmadusta lutea humphreysii on page 52."

This action, therefore, restores the original correct spelling of humphreyii. (FM, 2015-02-27).

Description
These quite uncommon shells reach on average  of length. The basic color and pattern of this species are quite variable. The dorsum surface is smooth and shiny, its color is white or pale pink, with many brown spots, while the edges and the extremities are orange with darker spots extended to the base. The underside may be orange, pale yellow, pale brown or pale pink, with a narrow sinuous aperture and well-developed teeth. In the living cowries the mantle is bright red, the mantle and the foot are well developed, with short papillae and external antennae.

Distribution
This endemic species occurs in the sea along East Africa and Western Pacific Ocean (Malaysia, Queensland, New South Wales, Papua New Guinea, New Caledonia, Solomon Islands, Tonga, Fiji).

Habitat

Subspecies
Palmadusta humphreysii humphreisii (Gray, 1825) . accepted , alternate representation
Palmadusta humphreysii yaloka Steadman & Cotton, 1943: synonym of  Palmadusta humphreyii (Gray, 1825)
Palmadusta humphreysii f. "coccinella" Lorenz and Hubert, 2000: synonym of ''Palmadusta johnsonorum Lorenz, 2002

References

Further reading
 Burgess, C.M. (1970). The Living Cowries. AS Barnes and Co, Ltd. Cranbury, New Jersey
 Lorenz F. (2002) New worldwide cowries. Descriptions of new taxa and revisions of selected groups of living Cypraeidae (Mollusca: Gastropoda).'' Schriften zur Malakozoologie aus dem Haus der Natur-Cismar 20: 1-292, pls 1-40.

External links
 Shell
 Clade
 Biolib

Cypraeidae
Gastropods described in 1825
Taxa named by John Edward Gray